Huib is a Dutch given name. Notable people with this name include:

 Huib Bakker (born 1965), Dutch physicist
 Huib Drion (1917–2004), Dutch law scholar and judge
 Huib Emmer (born 1951), Dutch composer
 Huib Luns (1881–1942), Dutch painter, sculptor and writer
 Huib Ruijgrok (born 1944), Dutch football coach

Dutch masculine given names